The 1920 SAFL Grand Final was an Australian rules football competition.  beat  69 to 21.

Teams

References

SANFL Grand Finals
1920 in Australian rules football